The teams events at the 2021 ICF Canoe Slalom World Championships took place on 22 September 2021 at the Čunovo Water Sports Centre in Bratislava. It was the 41st edition of the K1M, K1W and C1M team events, and the 8th edition of the C1W team event.

Competition format
Teams events in canoe slalom use a single-round format with the team with the fastest time inclusive of penalties awarded gold. Teams started in reverse order of their results at the previous World Championships in 2019. Teams consist of three athletes from the same nation, who must complete the course at the same time, often employing a technique known as 'weaving' in upstream gates, where one paddler exits the gate at the same time as the other enters in order to minimise time loss.

Penalties are compounded for each gate, such that a team can incur a total of 150 seconds of penalties on a single gate (if all three miss it) or 6 seconds (if all three touch it). The time begins when the first paddler crosses the start beam and ends when the last one crosses the finish beam. All three paddlers must cross the finish line within 15 seconds or else incur an additional 50 second penalty.

Schedule
All times are Central European Summer Time (UTC+2)

Women's K1 Teams
Great Britain entered the event as favourites, being the reigning World and European Champions. They won the event with a clean run of 101.24 seconds over 2019 silver-medallists the Czech Republic and host nation Slovakia. The British win was particularly significant, given Kimberley Woods had been in a wheelchair less than a week prior, following a car accident. This was Jana Dukátová's last teams event after she announced her retirement at the end of 2021, having taken the teams title in 2011.

Men's K1 Teams
Spain entered the event as the reigning World Champions, whilst the Czech republic fielded a team including 2020 Olympic Champion Jiří Prskavec and 2021 overall World Cup Champion Vít Přindiš. The event was won by France in a clean run of 91.64 ahead of host nation Slovakia and Slovenia. The Czech Republic finished fourth after Prskavec had to paddle back for gate 10 following a near collision whilst weaving. Germany completed the course in the fastest raw time (90.99) but was awarded a 50 second penalty after they missed the last upstream gate in the windy conditions. 20 nations in total competed.

Women's C1 Teams
Reigning World Champions Australia did not compete, fielding a depleted team at the championships due to COVID-19 travel restrictions. This meant that Spain held the number 1 bib after their silver medal in 2019. The Czech Republic team of 2021 overall World Cup Champion Tereza Fišerová and sisters Gabriela and Martina Satková won with a total time of 110.43, their seventh consecutive top three finish in this event. Spain came second by 1.57 seconds, and the team representing the Russian Canoe Federation placed third.

Men's C1 Teams
Host nation Slovakia entered the event as the distinct favourites, having won the C1 team title a record 9 consecutive times from 2009 to 2019 - the longest winning streak in any canoe slalom event. The french team of 2021 overall World Cup Champion Denis Gargaud Chanut, 2020 Olympian Martin Thomas and two-time U23 World Champion Nicolas Gestin won in a time of 95.34, just beating out the Czech Republic. The reigning champions had to settle for the bronze after an early mistake.

References

ICF Canoe Slalom World Championships
World Championships
ICF
International sports competitions hosted by Slovakia
Sport in Bratislava
Canoeing in Slovakia
ICF